Tom Flynn (born  ) is an Irish sportsperson. Flynn plays club football and hurling with Athenry and has played senior inter-county football for Galway since 2011. Flynn was a member of the Galway teams that won the All-Ireland Under-21 Football Championship in 2011 and 2013.

He won the 2011 Cadbury's Hero of the Future award, receiving it at a ceremony at Croke Park.

Honours
 Sigerson Cup (1): 2015 (C)
 Connacht Senior Football Championship (2): 2016, 2018
 Connacht Under-21 Football Championship (2): 2011, 2013
 All-Ireland Under-21 Football Championship (2): 2011, 2013

References

1992 births
Living people
Galway inter-county Gaelic footballers
DCU Gaelic footballers